Robin Russell (August 27, 1951 - September 8, 2021) was an American drummer, songwriter, and recording artist from Los Angeles, California.

Career 
As of September 1972, Russell was the drummer with the rhythm and blues ensemble New Birth and their instrumental counterpart, the Nite-Liters.  Russell performed with Little Richard including the performance at "The London Rock and Roll Show", Wembley Stadium, London, England, August 5, 1972.  Russell also performed with Johnny "Guitar" Watson, disco era giant Sylvester, and performed with a variety of artists in the Los Angeles area including Richard Berry (composer of "Louie Louie"), Danny Flores (composer of "Tequila"), and Rosa Lee Brooks, who recorded "My Diary" with Jimi Hendrix.  Since the onset of digital recording technology in the 1980s, Russell's drums have been sampled by a number of Hip-Hop, Rap, and R&B artists including  Jamie Foxx, Mariah Carey, LL Cool J, Big Daddy Kane, Public Enemy, The Notorious B.I.G., Fat Joe, De La Soul, Black Sheep, A Tribe Called Quest, and more. In 2001 Russell contributed liner note comments for legendary jazz/fusion drummer Billy Cobham's Rudiments-Anthology CD,  and Russell was a featured artist in the June 2010 issue of Modern Drummer magazine. Most recently Russell's drumming was featured in an article written by Mary MacVean and published on the front page section of the Los Angeles Times newspaper, dated Friday, November 6, 2015. This article is also posted on latimes.com.  Over the years Russell  periodically joined New Birth for reunion shows. Russell passed in his Los Angeles home the morning of, September 8, 2021.

Television and film appearances
During the early and mid 1970s Russell (with New Birth and the Nite-Liters) appeared on numerous syndicated television shows including American Bandstand, Don Kirshner's Rock Concert, Soul Train, The Merv Griffin Show, Soul, and in 1975 Russell made a cameo appearance as a guest percussionist with Buddy Miles & the Earth Rockers in an episode of Don Kirshner's Rock Concert.  Russell's performance with Little Richard at Wembley Stadium was filmed, aired on television, included as part of a DVD released in 1973 as "The London Rock and Roll Show", and released in 2001 as a CD of the same title.

Movie Scores and Television Commercials
Russell's drumming can also be heard as a portion of the sound track for the 1973 action movie Gordon's War, starring Paul Winfield, where New Birth performed the song "Come On and Dream Some Paradise," and around 2006-07 a Jeep Compass commercial was aired on television using an altered sample of New Birth's "Got to Get a Knutt", of which Russell is a co-writer.

Drumming in the great outdoors

With a deep appreciation for the forests and other scenic wonders of mother nature, Russell developed a passion for drumming in the great outdoors, and frequently set up in the mountains of Los Angeles's Griffith Park, where he was known to hold sunrise-to-sunset solo drum sessions.  Russell was also a solo performer (aka "Drum Beats") at the Los Angeles Marathon since 2004,  and at the Orange County Marathon since 2013, typically drumming non-stop for hours as a source of inspiration and energy for race participants.

Early life
Robin Russell was born in Los Angeles, California and grew up in the city's South Los Angeles area where he attended 59th Street Elementary School, Horace Mann Jr. High School, Washington Preparatory High School (freshman year), graduated from Crenshaw High School, and attended Los Angeles City College where he continued studies in drums and music.

Discography 
As Robin Russell
Drum Beats (CD Baby, 2004)

As New Birth
Birth Day (RCA, 1973) US #31, US Black Albums #1
It's Been a Long Time (RCA, 1974) US #50, US Black Albums #7
Comin' From All Ends (RCA, 1974) US #56, US Black Albums #20
Blind Baby (Buddah Records, 1975) US #57, US Black Albums #17
Love Potion (Warner Bros. Records, 1976) US #168, US Black Albums #22
Disco (RCA, 1977)
God's Children (PNEC Records, 1998)

As The Nite-Liters
A-Nal-Y-Sis (RCA, 1973) US Black Albums #34

With Little Richard
The London Rock and Roll Show - CD (2001 TKO/Magnum Music)

Singles with New Birth

References

External links 
 

American drummers
American rhythm and blues musicians
Musicians from Los Angeles
Living people
Crenshaw High School alumni
1951 births